Le Zénith is the name given to a series of indoor arenas in France. The first arena, the "Zénith Paris" is a rejuvenation of the Pavillon de Paris. In French culture, the word "zénith" has become synonymous with "theater". A zénith is a theater that can accommodate concert tours, variety shows, plays, musicals and dance recitals. All zeniths carry a similar internal design of an indoor amphitheater that can seat at least 3,000 spectators.

A venue was planned to open in Saint-Denis, Réunion entitled Zénith du Port. The arena was proposed in 2005 by the city council. Planned to open in 2008 with a capacity of 6,000, the construction of the arena was shut down. It was determined the venue would not be profitable as there was no research done to see which events the arena could house. They also felt the venue would be a hard sell to bring in international talent. Kabardock was built on the proposed site of the zenith.

Zénith Paris

Address: Allée du Zénith, 75019 Paris, France	
Built: 1983
Opened: January 1984
Capacity: ~6,300
Website: Le Zénith de Paris website

The Zénith Paris—La Villette is an indoor arena in the 19th arrondissement in Paris. The arena was built in 1983 at the site of the former music hall, Pavillon de Paris, by architects Phillippe Chaix and Jean-Paul Morel. The construction of the arena was initiated by Minister of Culture, Jack Lang, to maintain the rock and roll scene to Paris. 

The first musician to perform at the venue was French singer-songwriter Renaud Séchan. Over the years, the venue has played host to many French artists including Jenifer, Jean-Jacques Goldman, Vanessa Paradis, Mr. Hankey, Johnny Hallyday, Alizée,  and Michel Sardou. Several international artists have played the venue including Janet Jackson, Suprême NTM, Sigur Rós, Pantera, Toto, Blur, Nas, Björk, Lara Fabian, Britney Spears, Christina Aguilera, Bruce Springsteen, Grateful Dead, Alicia Keys, Demi Lovato, Anastacia, Rihanna, Amy Winehouse, Korean K-pop group Super Junior, LOONA, Finnish band Nightwish, and Japanese band L'Arc-en-Ciel. Live albums by Simple Minds, The Cure, Muse, Evanescence, Morrissey, Les Cowboys Fringants, The Hives, Archive, and Chico Buarque have been recorded at the venue.

The arena has hosted the MTV Europe Music Awards in 1995, World Wrestling Entertainment in 2007 and Total Nonstop Action Wrestling in 2010.

It is the first incarnation of the "Le Zénith" franchise.

Le Zénith Sud

Address: 2733 Avenue Albert Einstein 34000 Montpellier, France
Built: 1985—1986
Opened: 1986
Capacity: 6,300
Website: Zénith Sud Website

Le Zénith Sud (originally known as Zénith de Montpellier) is an indoor arena in Montpellier. The venue was designed by architects Phillippe Chaix and Jean-Paul Morel, who have designed several other "Le Zénith" buildings. The building opened in 1986 and was renovated in 2001 and 2006. It was the main arena in Montpellier until the Arena Montpellier opened in 2010.  Over the course of 25 years, the arena has hosted concerts by Ben Harper, Muse, -M-, Yannick Noah and Deep Purple.

It is the second incarnation of the "Le Zénith" franchise.

Zénith Oméga de Toulon

Address: Boulevard du Commandant Nicolas 83000 Toulon, France
Built: Unknown
Opened: September 1992
Capacity:8,875
Website: Zénith Oméga de Toulon Website

The Zénith Oméga de Toulon (also known as Zénith Omega) is an indoor arena located in Toulon. The arena opened September 7, 1992. The venue also has a nightclub called Omega Live. The space is used for private events and after parties. The arena has hosted concerts by Mylène Farmer, Zazie, Depeche Mode, Jenifer, Tina Turner and David Bowie.

It is the third incarnation of the "Le Zénith" franchise.

Zénith de Pau

Address: Boulevard du Cami-Salié 64000 Pau, France
Built: 1990—1992
Opened: December 1992
Capacity: 7,500
Website: Zénith de Pau Website

The Zénith de Pau is an indoor arena located in Pau. Located near the Hippodrome du Pont-Long, the arena's design is identical to the Palais des Sports de Pau, which is nearby the venue. The venue opened on December 12, 1992. A concert by Johnny Hallyday followed the next day. The venue host many musical events along with theatrical shows. Concerts by Garou, André Rieu, Frédéric François, Véronique Sanson and William Sheller.

It is the fourth incarnation of the "Le Zénith" franchise.

Zénith de Nancy
Address: Rue du Zénith 54320 Maxéville, France
Built: Unknown
Opened: 1993
Capacity: 4,718 (arena) 19,657 (amphitheater)
Website: Zénith de Nancy Website

The Zénith de Nancy (also known as Zénith Nancy de Maxéville or Zénith du Grand Nancy) is an indoor arena located in Maxéville, northwest of Nancy. The venue consists of an indoor theatre (known as "Grande salle du Zénith") and an outdoor amphitheater. It is the largest and most frequently used zénith. The venue has hosted concerts by Rammstein, Depeche Mode, Elton John, Guns N' Roses, Tokio Hotel and Natasha St-Pier.

It is the fifth incarnation of the "Le Zénith" franchise.

Zénith de Caen

Address: Rue Joseph Philippon 14000 Caen, France
Built: Unknown
Opened: June 1993
Capacity: ~7,000
Website: Zénith de Caen Website

The Zénith de Caen  (also known as Zénith Caen—Normandie) is an indoor arena located in Caen. The venue, designed by Jacques Millet and Claude Renouf, opened in June 1993. Leonard Cohen and Eddy Mitchell, along with stage performances of Grease and the Cuban National Ballet.

It is the sixth incarnation of the "Le Zénith" franchise.

Zénith de Lille

Address: 1 Boulevard des Cités Unies 59777 Lille, France
Built: 1988—1994
Opened: June 1994 (Arena opened in November 1994)
Capacity: 7,000
Website: Zénith de Lille Website

The Zénith de Lille (also known as Zénith Arena)  is an indoor arena located in Lille near the Université du Droit et de la Santé. The arena was a long term project commissioned by former mayor of Lille, Pierre Mauroy. The space was intended to be a competitor for Paris' Palais Omnisports de Paris-Bercy to bring sporting events, theatrical shows and concerts from South England. The project began in 1980 however it was not completed until June 1994.

The venue, designed by Rem Koolhaas, contains three auditoriums, 28 meetings rooms, a banquet hall and the Zénith Arena. It has hosted concerts by Kylie Minogue, Aretha Franklin, Goldfrapp, Dusty Springfield, Eminem and Portishead.

It is the seventh incarnation of the "Le Zénith" franchise.

Zénith d'Orléans
Address: 1 Rue du Président Robert Schuman, 45100 Orléans, France
Built: 1995—1996
Opened: September 1996
Capacity: 6,900
Website: Zénith d'Orléans Website

The Zénith d'Orléans (also known as Zénith Orléans) is an indoor arena located in Orléans. The venue opened on September 26, 1996. The first concert was by Charles Aznavour on October 3, 1996. Not only does the venue host entertainment events, it is one of the few zéniths that serves as a sporting arena. The venue is the home arena of the Orléans Loiret Basket. The arena has hosted concerts by Grégoire, Julien Clerc, Patrick Fiori, Élie Semoun and Joan Baez.

It is the eighth incarnation of the "Le Zénith" franchise.

Zénith de Toulouse

Address: 11 Avenue Raymond Badiou 31000 Toulouse, France
Built: 1998
Opened: April 1999
Capacity: 9,000
Website: Le Zénith de Toulouse Website

The Zénith de Toulouse is an indoor arena located in Toulouse. The venue was designed by André and Serge Gresy, who have also done the Palais Nikaia, Zénith d'Auvergne and the Grande Halle d'Auvergne. The arena began construction in 1998 and opened in April 1999. The first event held at the venue was a concert organized by Jean-Pierre Mader. The concert was hosted by French actor Ticky Holgado and featured performances by Chevaliers du fil, Pauline Ester, Bernardo Sandoval, and the l’Orchestre de chambre national de Toulouse. The venue faced renovations after the explosion at the nearby AZF Factory.

Over the years, the arena has hosted concerts by The Cranberries, Muse, Depeche Mode, Kylie Minogue, Norah Jones, Green Day, The Who and Snarky Puppy.

It is the ninth incarnation of the "Le Zénith" franchise.

Zénith de Rouen

Address: 4 Avenue des Canadiens 76120 Le Grand-Quevilly, France
Built: March 3, 2000—January 12, 2001
Opened: February 25, 2001
Capacity: 8,000
Website: Zénith de Rouen Website

The Zénith de Rouen (also known as Zénith de l'Agglo de Rouen) is an indoor arena located in Le Grand-Quevilly, five miles southwest of Rouen. The arena was designed by Swedish architect, Bernard Tschumi in 2001. His designed was honored by the American Institute of Architects. The arena has hosted concerts by Eddy Mitchell, Michel Sardou and Frédéric François.

It is the tenth incarnation of the "Le Zénith" franchise.

Zénith d'Auvergne

Address: Rue de Sarliève 63800 Cournon-d'Auvergne, France
Built: 2003
Opened: December 2003
Capacity: 9,400
Website: Zénith d'Auvergne Website

The Zénith d'Auvergne is indoor arena located in Cournon-d'Auvergne, nearly seven miles east of Clermont-Ferrand. It is located at the Grande Halle d'Auvergne.  It was designed by André and Serge Gresy. The building completed construction in October 2003, followed by a concert featuring Johnny Hallyday in December 2003. The venue has hosted the Davis Cup in 2007 and 2010. It was also the site for the Dakar Rally in 2004.

It has hosted concerts by Jean Michel Jarre, Pierre Perret and Yannick Noah, along with stage performances of Dora the Explorer, Lord of the Dance and Scooby-Doo and the Pirate Ghost.

It is the eleventh incarnation of the "Le Zénith" franchise.

Zénith de Dijon

Address: Allée Colchide 21000 Dijon, France
Built: 2004—2005
Opened: October 2005
Capacity: 7,800
Website: Zénith de Dijon Website

The Zénith de Dijon (also known as Zénith Dijon) is an indoor arena located within the Parc de la Toison d'Or in Dijon. The venue was designed by Philippe Chaix and Jean-Paul Morel. Construction began October 2004 and was completed in August 2005. The venue opened on October 6, 2005. To celebrate its fifth anniversary, the venue hosted a celebration festival that included a performance by American rock band Santana.

Over the years, the arena has hosted concerts by Sylvie Vartan, Thomas Fersen, Franz Ferdinand, Moby and Joan Baez.

It is the twelfth incarnation of the "Le Zénith" franchise.

Zénith de Nantes Métropole

Address: ZAC D'ar Mor 44800 St Herblain, France
Built: 2004—2006
Opened: December 2006
Capacity: 8,500
Website: Zénith de Nantes Métropole Website

The Zénith de Nantes Métropole is an indoor arena in located in Nantes (in the suburb of Saint-Herblain). The arena is located near the Atlantis le Centre. The venue was designed by Phillippe Chaix and Jean-Paul Morel, who have designed several "Le Zénith" arenas. Construction began in 2003 and completed in 2006. Alternative rock band, Placebo became the inaugural event for the venue on December 2, 2006. Since then, the arena has hosted numerous artists including  Muse, Sheryl Crow, Linkin Park, Jeff Beck, Simple Plan and Sting.

It is the thirteenth incarnation of the "Le Zénith" franchise.

Zénith de Limoges

Address: 16, Avenue Jean Monnet 87100, Limoges, France
Built: 2005—2007
Opened: March 2007
Capacity: 6,000
Website: Zénith de Limoges Website

The Zénith de Limoges (also known as Zénith de Limoges Métropole) is an indoor arena located in Limoges. The venue was designed by Bernard Tschumi, who also designed the Zénith de Rouen. The arena was originally proposed in 1995 to be included in  Limoges Métropole. Construction was pushed back until 2005 due to funding. The first brick was laid on April 8, 2005.  The building features a unique exterior feature that displays several douglas-fir surrounded in a polycarbonate shell. The venue opened on March 17, 2007, with a concert by Michel Polnareff. Since its opening, the arena has hosted events by Patrick Bruel, Pascal Obispo and Joan Baez.

It is the fourteenth incarnation of the "Le Zénith" franchise.

Zénith de Strasbourg

Address: BP 84097 Eckbolsheim 1 allée du Zénith, 67034 Strasbourg Cedex 2, France
Built: 2006—2007
Opened: January 2008
Capacity: ~12,100
Website: Zénith de Strasbourg Website

The Zénith de Strasbourg (also known as Zénith Europe)  is an indoor arena located in Eckbolsheim, three miles west of Strasbourg. The venue began construction in January 2006 and ended in December 2007. The venue was designed by famed Italian architect, Massimiliano Fuksas.  The exterior of the building was meant to mimic the lantern of Aladdin. On opening night, the venue hosted several free concerts from local bands in Strasbourg.

The first event held at the arena was "W9VIP Live" on January 9, 2009. The event was organized by French television stations W9 and M6 to commemorate Télévision Numérique Terrestre (digital television in France). The concert contained performances by Alizée Jacotey, Amel Bent, Emma Bunton, Christophe Maé, Jenifer Bartoli, Laure Pester, Melissa M and Les Déesses.

The venue has hosted many artists including: Coldplay, Beyoncé Knowles, Guns N' Roses, Lady Gaga, Depeche Mode and Elton John. It has also hosted WWE Smackdown and Festival des Artefacts.

It is the fifteenth incarnation of the "Le Zénith" franchise.

Zénith d'Amiens

Address: impasse de l'Hippodrome 80000 Amiens, France
Built: 2006—2008
Opened: September 2008
Capacity: 6,000
Website: Zénith d'Amiens Website

The Zénith d'Amiens (also known as SAS Zénith Amiens Métropole) is an indoor arena located in Amiens near the Stade de la Licorne and Hippodrome d'Amiens. The venue was designed by famed Italian architect, Massimiliano Fuksas. Construction began in May 2006 and was completed in July 2008. The arena was to be completed in November 2007 but was stalled an additional eight months due to financing. The arena conveys a smiler design to Zénith de Strasbourg, completed only seven months earlier. It opened on September 27, 2008 with a free concert by Arno Elias, Rokia Traoré and Keziah Jones.

Artists to have played the venue include Marc Anthony, Lara Fabian, Christophe Maé, Nicolas Canteloup and Pascal Obispo

It is the sixteenth incarnation of the "Le Zénith" franchise.

Zénith de Saint-Étienne

Address: Rue Scheurer-Kestner 42000 Saint-Etienne, France
Built: 2006—2008
Opened: October 2008
Capacity: 7,200
Website: Zénith de Saint-Étienne Website

The Zénith de Saint-Étienne (also known as Zénith de Saint-Étienne Métropole) is an indoor arena located in Saint-Étienne, near Stade Geoffroy-Guichard. Construction began in September 2006 and was designed by Norman Foster. The building has an aluminum roof that is designed to capture winds, acting as a natural ventilation. The arena opened October 10, 2008 with a concert by Johnny Hallyday for :fr:Tour 66. The venue has hosted concerts by Bernard Lavilliers, Jean Michel Jarre and Michel Sardou.

It is the seventeenth incarnation of the "Le Zénith" franchise.

See also
Zenith (disambiguation)

References

Zenith
Zenith